Tri-State is the debut studio album by the British progressive trance group Above & Beyond, released on 6 March 2006. The album features collaborations with Zoë Johnston, Richard Bedford, Carrie Skipper and progressive trance producer Andy Moor. The first single from the album, "Air for Life", was released on 18 July 2005, and was voted Tune of the Year in 2005 on Armin Van Buuren's A State of Trance radio show. The single "Good For Me (Above & Beyond Club Mix)", featuring Zoë Johnston was voted Tune of the Year in 2006 on A State of Trance. During New Year's Eve in 2007, Above & Beyond performed at Barra Beach, Rio de Janeiro, to an estimated crowd of a million people where they showcased tracks from Tri-State along with their previous singles. Later that year, a remix album, Tri-State Remixed, was released.

Critical reception
Jon O' Brien from AllMusic described the album as "echoing the sleek, electronic rhythms, melodic vocals, and lush, ethereal production of BT and Delirium", whose tracks are a "combination of uplifting club anthems and hypnotic instrumentals". BBC's Andy Puleston wrote that together with singles "Air For Life" and "Alone Tonight", Tri-State was a "sterling effort" to create a record that defines trance music the same way Faithless and Orbital did with their respective genres, but nevertheless "does little to deviate or expand on the brief".

In a 10-year-anniversary revisit of the album, Christina Hernandez from Dancing Astronaut dubbed "Good For Me" as "one of Above & Beyond’s top pieces of all time", and noted Richard Bedford's vocals on "Alone Tonight" whose "voice on it will continue to be listed among Above & Beyond’s most memorable compositions". She also called "Can't Sleep" as a "winning track from Tri-State", having been nominated to the top three trance tracks of 2006 on A State of Trance.

Track listing

Personnel
Credits adapted from AllMusic & Discogs

Technical and composing credits
Jono Grant – primary artist, arranger, composer, producer
Tony McGuinness – primary artist, arranger, composer, producer, vocals
Paavo Siljamäki – primary artist, arranger, producer
Richard Bedford – vocals (tracks 2,7,9)
Zoë Johnston – vocals (track 10)
Andy Moor – composer, primary artist, producer
Carrie Skipper – vocals
Ashley Tomberlin – composer, vocals (track 5)
Hannah Thomas – vocals (track 13)

Creative credits
James Grant – management
Dan Myles – label management
Tim Ashton – photography, illustration
Chris Davison – photography
Jono Grant – sleeve design, photography
Tony McGuinness – sleeve design, photography
Paavo Siljamäki – sleeve design, photography

Recording personnel
Miles Showell – mastering

References

External links
Tri-State at Discogs

2006 debut albums
Above & Beyond (band) albums
Anjunabeats albums